Spodnja Dobrava is a village in the Municipality of Radovljica in the Upper Carniola region of Slovenia. It has a population of 50.

Name
Spodnja Dobrava was attested in written sources as Hard in 1368, and as Niderhard and Nadabra in 1498. The name Spodnja Dobrava literally means 'lower Dobrava' and reflects its elevation contrast with neighboring Srednja Dobrava (literally, 'middle Dobrava', about  higher) and Zgornja Dobrava (literally, 'upper Dobrava', about  higher). The place name Dobrava is relatively frequent in Slovenia. It is derived from the Slovene common noun dobrava 'gently rolling partially wooded land' (and archaically 'woods, grove'). The name therefore refers to the local geography.

References

External links

Spodnja Dobrava at Geopedia

Populated places in the Municipality of Radovljica